Hope Lutheran Church may refer to:

Hope Lutheran Church (Westcliffe, Colorado), listed on the National Register of Historic Places in Custer County, Colorado
Hope Lutheran Church (Elgin, North Dakota), listed on the National Register of Historic Places in Grant County, North Dakota